Jacques Gaston Murray (born Gaston Jacques Kalifa; 8 February 1920) is a French-born British billionaire businessman.

Murray and his family own Andrew Sykes Group, the heating and air-conditioning equipment hire company, and London Security, the Leeds-based fire protection business which includes the Nu-Swift fire extinguisher brand.

According to according to The Sunday Times Rich List 2022. his net worth is estimated at £2.53 billion. He turned 100 in February 2020.

Early life
Tony Murray was born in Paris, France on 8 February 1920 and was originally named Gaston Jacques Kalifa. His father ran a construction company that worked on infrastructure projects such as bridges. He was accepted to study architecture at the Ecole des Beaux-Arts in Paris before the outbreak of World War II. He escaped from Paris at the time of the German invasion of France and reached Biarritz where he boarded a Polish ship which took him to England. He enlisted in the Free French forces and eventually transferred to the Royal Air Force (RAF). He flew 38 missions as a navigator in No. 613 Squadron RAF. He received British citizenship after the war.

His father was murdered in Auschwitz. He was awarded the Legion of Honour by the French government.

Career
In 1982, Murray bought Nu-Swift, a Leeds manufacturer of fire extinguishers then in difficulties, with the businessman Michael Ashcroft. Murray later "became irritated" by Ashcroft getting too much of the credit for turning round the company.

Personal life
His sons, Jean-Jacques Murray and Jean‑Pierre Murray are both directors of London Security, the latter being non-executive.

References

1920 births
Living people
British billionaires
British businesspeople
British Jews
Businesspeople from Paris
Free French military personnel of World War II
French billionaires
French emigrants to England
Recipients of the Legion of Honour
Royal Air Force personnel of World War II
British centenarians
French centenarians
Men centenarians
French emigrants to the United Kingdom